The movie Aaj Ki Raat is a 1948 Bollywood production. It starred Suraiya and Motilal Rajvansh and was directed by D.D. Kashyap. The other actors included Yakub, Shah Nawaz, Leela Mishra, Anita Sharma, Raj Mehra, Sangeeta The music was given by Husnlal-Bhagatram and lyricist for the movie was Rajendra Krishan.

References 

Indian black-and-white films
1948 films